Mordechai Shrager is a former Israeli footballer who played in Maccabi Rehovot and Maccabi Netanya.

References

Living people
Israeli Jews
Israeli footballers
Maccabi Rehovot F.C. players
Maccabi Netanya F.C. players
Association footballers not categorized by position
Year of birth missing (living people)